Sanglākh is a valley in Afghanistan located in the province of Maidan Wardak, in the central part of the country.

See also 
 Valleys of Afghanistan

References 

Populated places in Maidan Wardak Province
Valleys of Afghanistan
Maidan Wardak Province
Hazarajat